All Night Long may refer to:

Film, TV and theatre

Film
 All Night Long (1924 film), an American silent short film featuring Harry Langdon
 All Night Long (1962 film), a British film directed by Basil Dearden
 All Night Long (1981 film), a comedy film starring Barbra Streisand and Gene Hackman
 All Night Long (1989 film), a Hong Kong film of 1989
 All Night Long (1992 film), a Japanese film featuring Ryōka Yuzuki
 All Night Long (1995 film), a Hong Kong film produced by Golden Harvest

Television
 All Night Long (TV series), a British sitcom
 "All Night Long", an episode of the anime Black Heaven

Theatre
 All Night Long, a 1984 play by John O'Keefe that featured Alyssa Milano in its original Off-Broadway production

Music

Albums
 All Night Long (Buckcherry album) or the title song 2010
 All Night Long (Junior Kimbrough album) or the title song, 1992
 All Night Long (Kenny Burrell album) or the title song, 1956
 All Night Long (Sammy Hagar album), 1978
 All Night Long (Shirley Horn album), 1981
 All Night Long: An Introduction, by Rainbow, 2002
 All Night Long: Live in Dallas, by Joe Walsh, 2013
 All Night Long, by Billy Burnette, 1999

Songs
 “All Night Long” (Alexandra Burke song)
 “All Night Long” (Ami Suzuki song)
 “All Night Long” (Blazin' Squad song)
 “All Night Long” (Common song)
 "All Night Long" (Faith Evans song)
 "All Night Long" (Joe Walsh song)
 “All Night Long” (Joel Turner song)
 “All Night Long” (Mary Jane Girls song)
 "All Night Long" (Rainbow song)
 “All Night Long” (Simon Mathew song), the Danish entry in the Eurovision Song Contest 2008
 “All Night Long (All Night)”, by Lionel Richie
 “Mary Jane (All Night Long)”, by Mary J. Blige
 “Touch Me (All Night Long)”, by Cathy Dennis
 "All Night Long", by Aretha Franklin from Aretha: With The Ray Bryant Combo
 "All Night Long", by Billy Squier from Signs of Life
 "All Night Long", by Brownsville Station from Yeah!
 "All Night Long", by Demi Lovato from Unbroken
 "All Night Long", by Diddy from Press Play
 "All Night Long", by Eve
 "All Night Long", by Jonas Blue and RetroVision
 "All Night Long", by Lasgo from Far Away
 "All Night Long", by Little Richard from The Fabulous Little Richard
 "All Night Long", by LMFAO from Sorry for Party Rocking
 "All Night Long", by Montgomery Gentry and Charlie Daniels from Tattoos & Scars (1999)
 "All Night Long", by Nate Dogg from Nate Dogg
 "All Night Long", by Paul Revere & The Raiders
 "All Night Long", by Peter Murphy from Love Hysteria
 "All Night Long", by Scorpions from Tokyo Tapes
 "All Night Long", by the Verve, B-side of the single “Rather Be”

See also
 "You Shook Me All Night Long", a song by AC/DC
 Duet All Night Long, a split EP by Reel Big Fish and Zolof the Rock & Roll Destroyer
 All Night Wrong, a 2002 album by Allan Holdsworth
 "All Nightmare Long", a song by Metallica
 "All Right Now", a song by Free, misheard as "All Night Long"